Charles Vyt (born 2 January 1914, date of death unknown) was a Belgian modern pentathlete. He competed at the 1948 Summer Olympics and he was also the flag bearer for Belgium at these Olympics.

References

External links
 

1914 births
Year of death missing
Belgian male modern pentathletes
Olympic modern pentathletes of Belgium
Modern pentathletes at the 1948 Summer Olympics
People from Brasschaat
Sportspeople from Antwerp Province